St. Malo Provincial Park is a provincial park on the Rat River near St. Malo, Manitoba, Canada.

History
St. Malo Provincial Park was designated a provincial park by the Government of Manitoba in 1961.

See also
List of provincial parks in Manitoba

References

External links

iNaturalist: St. Malo Provincial Park

Further reading

Parks in Eastman Region, Manitoba
Provincial parks of Manitoba
2015 establishments in Manitoba
Protected areas of Manitoba